Choe Ryong-hae (born 15 January 1950) is a North Korean politician and military officer who currently serves as Chairman of the Standing Committee of the Supreme People's Assembly and First Vice President of the State Affairs Commission, holding both positions since April 2019. Due to holding the first office, he was considered the head of state of North Korea before the country's constitution was amended to transfer this position to the President of the State Affairs Commission, Kim Jong-un. He is also a member of the Presidium of the Politburo and Vice Chairman of the Workers' Party of Korea (WPK). He also served as Supreme Leader Kim Jong-un's military second-in-command, currently being third top-ranking official in North Korea after Kim Jong-un and premier Kim Tok-hun.

Early life
Choe Ryong-hae was born in Sinchon County, South Hwanghae Province, on 15 January 1950, to Choe Hyon, who fought as a guerrilla affiliated Northeast Anti-Japanese United Army alongside Kim Il-sung and subsequently served as defence minister of North Korea. As such, Choe is considered a second-generation revolutionary from a privileged background. He joined the Korean People's Army (KPA) in 1967 and graduated from Kim Il-sung University as a political and economic expert.

Career
Choe's political career began in the 1970s when he worked as a political instructor on behalf of the Workers' Party of Korea (WPK) at Kim Il-sung University. In the 1980s, he was a leading member of the League of Socialist Working Youth of Korea, being its vice-chairman from 1981 and chairman from 1986; when it was reformed into the Kim Il-sung Socialist Youth League in 1996, he was appointed its first secretary. In 1986, he was also elected deputy to the Supreme People's Assembly (SPA), member of the SPA Presidium and full member of the Central Committee of the WPK. In the 1990s, he also led the DPR Korea Football Association and the Taekwando Association of Korean Youth. He was awarded the title Hero of the DPRK in 1993. He was replaced as first secretary of the Youth League by Ri Il-hwan at the 14th plenary meeting of the league's central committee (January 1998), officially "due to his illness". This was actually because routine party audits found he was selling scrap metal to foreign buyers without official permission. He was facing execution but Kim Kyong-hui, only sister of then leader Kim Jong-il, intervened to save his life.

After facing re-education through labour, Choe was deputy director of the General Affairs Department of the WPK Central Committee, then chief secretary of the Hwanghae Province Party Committee from 2006 to 2010. In September 2010, during the 3rd Conference of the Workers' Party of Korea, he was promoted to KPA General as well as member of the WPK Secretariat and Central Military Commission, and Politburo alternate member. He was also appointed secretary for military affairs.

Choe did not receive particular public attention until General Secretary Kim Jong-il's death in December 2011. Choe was then seen as a key asset in securing Kim Jong-un's leadership. In April 2012, he received important promotions to Vice Marshal, member of the Presidium of the Politburo of the WPK, vice-chairman of the Central Military Commission, director of the KPA General Political Bureau and member of the National Defence Commission (NDC), largely filling the post left unoccupied by Jo Myong-rok's death and working as power broker for Kim Jong-un.

Choe, considered a protégé of Jang Song-thaek, is seen as part of a plan by Kim Jong-un to restore party control over the military after it was overturned by Kim Jong-il and his Military First Policy, particularly after Vice Marshal Ri Yong-ho's dismissal. In fact, Choe does not have a strong military background and seems to support the employment of soldiers to build civilian facilities. The Chosun Ilbo reports that a diplomatic source said Choe is appointing Socialist Youth League members to key military posts and "has assumed control of various businesses run by the military, losing trust and loyalty among the troops." Choe's inspections are the only ones, besides Kim Jong-un's and the Premier's, to be reported nationwide by state media.

By December 2012, Choe was demoted from Vice Marshal to General, as he was listed KPA General at a national meeting marking the first death anniversary of Kim Jong-il on 16 December and at the inaugural ceremony of the Kumsusan Palace of the Sun, though he wore KPA Vice Marshal insignia at the rally celebrating the successful Kwangmyŏngsŏng-3 Unit 2 launch on 14 December. This would be concurrent with Hyon Yong-chol's demotion to the same rank and Kim Jong-gak's removal as defence minister, and may be a consequence of the army's growing dissatisfaction over Choe's tenure. Choe was seen inexplicably wearing the Vice Marshal insignia again at a meeting in February 2013 and became Kim Jong-un's special envoy for strategic partner China.

Choe was appointed the first-ranking vice-chairman of the NDC in April 2014, apparently reinforcing his number two position, but he was replaced by newly appointed Vice Marshal Hwang Pyong-so as chief of the KPA politburo, and was officially demoted from the NDC after only five months, thus ending his involvement in military affairs. North Korea's news agency reported later on that he was party secretary in charge of labor organizations and chairman of the State Physical Culture and Sports Guidance Commission, a post previously held by Jang Song-thaek, and then part of a delegation to South Korea to attend the closing ceremony of the Asian Games. He was also restored to his Presidium position in late October, and finally demoted from it next February, although he remained a high-ranking member of the Politburo. Reports suggested arrogance and bad reputation among the elites as reasons leading to his downgrading. He was, however, reelected as a Presidium member at the 7th Party Congress in May 2016.

In November 2014, Choe brought a letter from Kim Jong-un to Russian president Vladimir Putin.

Choe's second son, Choe Song, was reported in January 2015 to have married Kim Jong-un's younger sister, Kim Yo-jong in late 2014.

In 2017, Choe was appointed to the party's Central Military Commission.

In October 2017, he was appointed the director of the Organization and Guidance Department (OGD). Before his appointment, OGD had been long headed either formally or informally by members of the Kim family. His immediate predecessor had been Kim Jong-un.

In April 2019, he became the President of the Presidium of the Supreme People's Assembly.

Sanctions
In December 2018, the United States Department of State and the Office of Foreign Assets Control imposed sanctions on Choe and two other North Korean officials for suspected human rights abuses and state-sponsored censorship activities.

Personal life
Choe reportedly has two sons and one daughter.

Awards and honors 
The official portrait of Choe shows Choe wearing all the decorations awarded to him.

Notes

References

|-

|-

|-

|-

|-

|-

|-

|-

1950 births
Living people
People from Sinchon County
North Korean military personnel
Members of the Presidium of the Workers' Party of Korea
Members of the 6th Central Committee of the Workers' Party of Korea
Members of the 6th Politburo of the Workers' Party of Korea
Members of the 6th Presidium of the Workers' Party of Korea
Members of the 7th Presidium of the Workers' Party of Korea
Members of the 8th Presidium of the Workers' Party of Korea
Vice Chairmen of the Workers' Party of Korea and its predecessors